Mustilia lieftincki is a moth in the Endromidae family. It was described by Roepke in 1948. It is found in Indonesia (Sumatra).

References

Moths described in 1948
Mustilia